Samuelson is an English-language patronymic surname meaning "son of Samuel". There are alternative spellings such as the Scandinavian-origin Samuelsson and Samuelsen. It is uncommon as a given name. Samuelson may refer to:

 Sir Bernhard Samuelson (1820–1905), British industrialist and educationalist
 Cecil O. Samuelson (born 1941), American physician, president of Brigham Young University
 Don Samuelson (1913–2000), American politician from Idaho
 Emily Samuelson (born 1990), American ice dancer
 G. B. Samuelson (1888–1947), British filmmaker
 Godfrey Samuelson (1863–1941), British politician, member of parliament 1887–92
 Gar Samuelson (1958–1999), American drummer for the band Megadeth
 Sir Henry Samuelson (1845–1937), English politician
 Karlie Samuelson (born 1995), American basketball player
 Katie Lou Samuelson (born 1997), American basketball player
 Linda C. Samuelson (born 1954), American physiologist
 Marc Samuelson, British television and film producer
 Marcus Samuelsson (born 1970), Ethiopia-born Swedish restaurateur
 Martha Samuelson, American business consultant
 Mikael Samuelson (born 1951), Swedish stage actor
 Pamela Samuelson, American professor of law at the University of California, Berkeley
 Paul Samuelson (1915–2009), American economist
 Peter Samuelson (born 1951), American filmmaker and philanthropist
 Ralph Samuelson (1903–1977), American inventor of water skiing
 Robert J. Samuelson (born 1945), American journalist, contributing editor for Newsweek and The Washington Post
 Ruth Samuelson (1959–2017), American politician
 Sivert Samuelson (1883–1958), South African cricketer
 Svend Samuelson (1825–1891), American farmer and politician
 Sir Sydney Samuelson (1925–2022), British film producer
 Victor Samuelson (born 1937), American businessman

Fictional characters
 Dr Torsten Samuelson, fictional character in Paid Programming, 2009 pilot for American TV programming block Adult Swim

See also 
 Samuels
 Samuelsen
 Samuelsson
 Samuelson Baronets

Patronymic surnames